Every Mother's Son was an American sunshine pop band formed in New York City in 1966. Coming from a folk rock background situated in Greenwich Village, the group scored their only Top 40 hit "Come On Down to My Boat" in 1967. Following their brief  commercial success, Every Mother's Son achieved lesser fortunes with songs such as "Put Your Mind at Ease" and "Pony with the Golden Mane", and recorded two studio albums before disbanding in 1968.

History 

The nucleus of Every Mother's Son formed in early 1966, when brothers Lary (vocals, guitar) and Dennis Larden (vocals, guitar) met Bruce Milner (organ, piano) at a Greenwich Village nightclub. The Larden brothers had previous experience playing four years together as a folk duo for engagements in Greenwich Village's burgeoning music scene. During this time they played all types of engagements, from private parties to Village night clubs. They worked only weekends since school and homework took up the other days of the week. Milner had also spent time performing with various folk bands, but desired to involve himself with a group long-term. 

Early in 1966 they decided that they would have more scope for musical growth as members of a rock group. Through a mutual friend they heard about a young musician named Bruce Milner, who, after a number of years as an organist with various groups, was looking for a permanent affiliation. Lary, Dennis, and Bruce met one momentous night in Greenwich Village, took to each other, and decided on the spot to form a rock group of their own. Within a week they added a bass plater, Schuyler Larson, and a drummer, Christopher Augustine. 

The group spent a month rehearsing, writing new songs, working together until they felt they were ready with their sound and ready to be seen professionally. They contacted Peter Leeds, young manager of record acts, who knew The Larden Brothers from their old folk duo days. They asked him to watch them perform at a college fraternity party, one that the boys had booked themselves. Leeds came to watch them, was strongly impressed, and signed them to a management contract. 

Peter Leeds put them in touch with writer-producer Wes Farrell in the summer of 1966. Their meeting with Farrell was their first major step on the road to fame and fortune. Farrell was a songwriter and record producer who had composed songs such as "Hang on Sloopy", "Boys", and "Come a Little Bit Closer". Farrell had the boys audition for him in a small studio in a ramshackle building off Broadway. After climbing three flights of stairs with their instruments and amplifiers in the 90 degree heat that July day, Every Mothers' Son were so beat that they forgot to be nervous. They came through so excitingly at the audition, that the hard-bitten Wes Farrell flipped over the group, and immediately signed them to record for his Senate Records Productions firm. He cut twelve sides, normally an unheard of practice with a new group, and took their records to a number of top record firms. Within a week five major labels were competing to distribute their records, and finally a deal was completed for Every Mothers' Son records to be released by MGM. MGM Records signed the group as a clean-cut alternative to the 1960s counterculture.

Late in 1966, Every Mother's Son recorded the Farrell and Jerry Goldstein-penned song "Come on Down to My Boat", originally released by the garage rock band The Rare Breed (who became The Ohio Express) under the title "Come and Take a Ride in My Boat" earlier in the year. An almost instant favorite on American pop radio stations, Every Mother's Son's take on the song reached number six on the Billboard Hot 100 in July 1967. Because the group was signed to MGM, not only did the band appear on several nationally televised programs to promote the single, they also were featured in a two-part episode of The Man from U.N.C.L.E. (series 3) entitled "The Five Daughters Affair", the combined episodes were also released as the movie "The Karate Killers". A self-titled studio album, featuring mainly original material as well as their hit single, followed soon after, and became a modest commercial success, peaking at number 117 on the Billboard 200. Much of the music on the album was described as "clean summer rock (with almost imperceptible echoes of The Beach Boys and The Association)".

Although Every Mother's Son never managed to attain commercial success that paralleled "Come on Down to My Boat", they flirted with the national charts throughout the remainder of the year. MGM Records quickly distributed their second album Every Mother's Son's Back in late 1967, spawning three charting singles, "Put Your Mind at Ease" (number 46), "Pony with the Golden Mane" (number 93), and "No One Knows" (number 96), but the album itself failed to sell in sufficient quantities to chart. Schuyler Larsen departed Every Mother's Son following the release of their sophomore effort, and was replaced by Don Kerr. In 1968 work commenced on a third album; however, the group disbanded by the end of the year. Dennis Larden later joined Ricky Nelson's Stone Canyon Band. In 1998, Collectables Records distributed the compilation album The Very Best of Every Mother's Son: Come on Down to My Boat. In 2012 a CD of both MGM albums and a bonus non-album single was issued by Now Sounds as "Come On Down: The Complete MGM Recordings" using the original master tapes.

One member, Bruce Milner, is now a dentist in both Manhattan, New York and Woodstock.

Members

The back of their debut record (which was self-titled) included a profile for each member. 
 Dennis Larden  – lead singer and lead guitar (electric guitar, banjo)
 Born in a small fishing village outside Kansas on November 22, 1948
 Got psyched on guitar at 13 after brother learned to play it. He felt brother was getting ahead of him, so he learned to play it on his own.
 Personality - wry sense of humor, creative, moody, intuitive
 Likes - performing music, wild key signatures, being a Scorpio
 Dislikes - athletics, ha-ha people, pushy people, problems, bags
 Favorite color is "pickle"
 Dennis is patriotic.
 Lary Larden  – lead singer and rhythm guitar (acoustical guitar and autoharp)
 Born in Brooklyn, New York on August 10, 1945
 Graduated from Brooklyn College and did graduate school at Columbia University
 Started professional career in music at sixteen, playing and signing at local cabana clubs and colleges. He took acting courses at college, and learned to play the guitar on his own.
 Personality - intellectual, extrovert, serious, wide-eyed
 Likes - skiing, flying (airplanes), jug band music, oil painting, Lennon-McCartney songs, college, Mamas & the Papas, John B. Sebastian, halvah
 Lary can out-drink the toughest guy on the block.
 Bruce Milner  – organist (piano and harpsichord)
 Born in Brooklyn, New York on May 9, 1943
 Attended the College of Dentistry at New York University
 Started performing as a duo, called Barry and Bruce, with his brother in 1950, when he was seven years old (his brother was six). He performed in summer camps, bungalow colonies and summer vacation resorts in New York State. The duo broke up about two years ago, and Bruce went out on his own as a single. He gave up a single career to join Every Mothers' Son.
 Personality - spontaneous, open-minded, thoughtful, introspective
 Likes - nice girls, solitude, teeth, opera
 Bruce brushes twice after ever meal.
 Christopher Augustine  –drummer (drums, tambourine, and shakers)
 Born in New York City on April 25, 1941
 His father was drummer with top swing bands
 Attended New School in New York City
 Studied acting at American Academy of Dramatic Arts. Acted in films, the New York Shakespeare Festival, and the American Playwright's Festival in Camden, Maine. Learned to play drums in school. Studies acting during the day, when not rehearsing or performing with Every Mothers' Son.
 Personality - independent, confident, determined, restless, dynamic
 Likes - acting, theatre, music, women who are intelligent as well as attractive
 Christopher believes in the Easter bunny.
 Schuyler Larsen  – bass player (electric bass and gutorone)
 Born in New York City on February 19, 1947
 Father studied opera at Juilliard School of Music in New York
 Attended the Academy of Aeronautics at LaGuardia Airport, New York
 Studied acting at Professional Children's School in New York. Learned bass and guitar at 14. Started playing local dances and country clubs. Since then has played with a dozen rock and roll groups searching for permanent affiliation. He has found one with Every Mothers' Son.
 Personality - shy, happy-go-lucky, methodical, patient
 Likes - younger girls who are hip, opera, The Yardbirds, raga music
 Schuyler never says anything stronger than !
 Don Kerr  – bass guitar

Discography

Albums

Singles

See also
 The Phynx, a 1970 movie with Dennis Larden

References

American pop music groups
MGM Records artists
Musical groups established in 1967
1967 establishments in New York City